Elections to Lincolnshire County Council were held on 6 May 2021, alongside other local elections.

Results by Division

Boston

East Lindsey

Lincoln

South Holland

North Kesteven

South Kesteven

West Lindsey

References 

2021
2021 English local elections
2020s in Lincolnshire